EJW may refer to:
 Econ Journal Watch, an electronic journal
 Equal Justice Works, a US coalition of law student organizations
 E J W, an England-based wrestling organisation